Baba C. Vemuri is the Wilson and Marie Collins Professor of Engineering and a Distinguished Professor at the Computer and Information Sciences and Engineering Department of the University of Florida. He is also the Director of Laboratory for Vision Graphics and Medical Imaging at University of Florida.

Education 
Baba Vemuri received his Bachelor of Engineering (B.E.) degree in Electronics and Communication Engineering from National Institute of Technology, Tiruchirappalli in 1979. He received his MS and PhD degrees in Electrical and Computer Engineering from University of Texas at Austin in 1982 and 1987 respectively.

Career 
He was a visiting faculty at IBM T. J. Watson Research Center, Yorktown Heights, New York and visiting research scientist at the German Aerospace Center, DLR, Germany. 

His research interests span, High-dimensional Geometric Statistics, Information Geometry, Machine Learning, Computer Vision and Medical Image Analysis. He has published over 200 journal and refereed conference papers in these fields.

Awards 
 IEEE Computer Society Technical Achievement Award, for “Pioneering and sustaining contributions to Computer Vision and Medical Image Analysis,”  2017.  
 Doctoral Dissertation Advisor/Mentoring Award, Herbert Wertheim College of Engineering, University of Florida, 2015-16.
 ACM Fellow, 2009.  
 IEEE Fellow, 2001.  
 Distinguished Alumnus Award in 2008 by National Institute of Technology, Tiruchirappalli.
 Whitaker Foundation Award in 1994.
 US National Science Foundation Research Initiation Award (NSF RIA) in 1988.

References 

Year of birth missing (living people)
Living people
American people of Indian descent
National Institute of Technology, Tiruchirappalli alumni
University of Florida faculty
Cockrell School of Engineering alumni